King Fahd Medical City (KFMC) is a medical facility in Riyadh, Saudi Arabia. The complex consists of four hospitals:  The Obstetrics & Gynecology Hospital, The Specialist Hospital, The Rehabilitation Hospital, and The Pediatric Hospital. It was built at a cost of $633 million. KFMC’s yearly operating budget is estimated at $150 million.

Hospitals and centers

Hospitals
 Main Hospital
 Children Specialized Hospital
 Women Specialized Hospital
 Rehabilitation Hospital

Centers
 National Neurosciences Institute
 King Salman Heart Centre
 Comprehensive Cancer Center
 Obesity, Endocrine, and Metabolism Center

KFMC Apps 
iKFMC App was designed to serve patients and employees of King Fahad Medical City, in addition to serving suppliers and all members of the community. Services provided by the App vary to suit the largest segment of users and facilitate access to information quickly and effectively. The medical service allows the patient to know all about appointments and medicines, as well as lab results, radiology, diagnosis, reports and files of relatives. It also provides employees with details about their leaves, salaries, and annual evaluation.

IKFMC Apple 

IKFMC Android  

Tahoor is an application that helps educating patients on smart devices in Arabic and English; spreading the concept of religious culture and raising awareness about what the patient needs as for the religious and the spiritual aspects. It also provides an interactive, practical, informative and advanced service that benefits the patient and eases the process of searching for information.

Tahoor Apple

References

External links
Official website

Hospitals in Saudi Arabia
Hospitals established in 2004
2004 establishments in Saudi Arabia
Lists of buildings and structures in Saudi Arabia